The Concert Sinatra is an album by American singer Frank Sinatra that was released in 1963. It consists of showtunes performed in a 'semi-classical' concert style. Marking a reunion between Sinatra and his frequent collaborator, arranger Nelson Riddle, it was the first full-album Riddle arranged on Sinatra's Reprise Records label. Riddle's orchestra consisted of 76 musicians, then the largest assembled for a Sinatra album, and was recorded at four soundstages on the Goldwyn Studios lot using eight tracks of Westrex 35mm film (see sound follower) and twenty-four RCA 44-BX ribbon microphones.

Track listing 
 "I Have Dreamed" (Richard Rodgers, Oscar Hammerstein II)  – 3:01
 "My Heart Stood Still" (Rodgers, Lorenz Hart)  – 3:06
 "Lost in the Stars" (Maxwell Anderson, Kurt Weill)  – 4:11
 "Ol' Man River" (Hammerstein, Jerome Kern)  – 4:29
 "You'll Never Walk Alone" (Rodgers, Hammerstein)  – 3:11
 "Bewitched, Bothered and Bewildered" (Rodgers, Hart)  – 3:02
 "This Nearly Was Mine" (Rodgers, Hammerstein) – 2:49
 "Soliloquy" (Rodgers, Hammerstein)  – 8:05
 Bonus tracks included on the 2012 reissue:
"California" (Sammy Cahn, Jimmy Van Heusen) - 3:36
"America the Beautiful" (Katharine Lee Bates, Samuel A. Ward) - 2:21

Personnel 
 Frank Sinatra – vocals
 Nelson Riddle – arranger, conductor
 Russ Hanson - engineer
 Vinton Vernon - mixer

References 

Frank Sinatra albums
Reprise Records albums
1963 albums
Albums arranged by Nelson Riddle
Albums conducted by Nelson Riddle